The sixteenth season of the Bleach anime series is known as the . It is directed by Noriyuki Abe, and produced by TV Tokyo, Dentsu and Studio Pierrot. Based on Tite Kubo's Bleach manga series, the season is set seventeen months after Ichigo Kurosaki lost his Soul Reaper powers and meets a man known as Kūgo Ginjō who proposes him to recover them.

The season aired from October 2011 to March 2012. Aniplex collected it in six DVD volumes between August 22, 2012 and January 23, 2013. The English adaptation of the Bleach anime is licensed by Viz Media, and this season started airing on Adult Swim's Toonami programming block on May 4 and finished on November 2, 2014.
The episodes of this season use three pieces of theme music; one opening and two endings. The opening theme is "Harukaze" by Scandal. The first ending theme, "Re:pray" by Aimer is used from episodes 343 to 354 and the second ending theme, "MASK" by Aqua Timez is used from episode 355 to 366.


Episode list

References
General

Specific

2011 Japanese television seasons
2012 Japanese television seasons
Season 16